Erik Neander (born May 25, 1983) is an American front office executive in Major League Baseball (MLB) for the Tampa Bay Rays. He has worked for the Rays since 2007, and became the team's president of baseball operations in September 2021.

Career
Neander was raised in Oneonta, New York, and attended the local high school, where he played baseball. Neander graduated from Virginia Tech and started working for Baseball Info Solutions, joining the Tampa Bay Rays as an intern in 2007.

Neander was promoted to vice president of baseball operations in October 2014. He succeeded Matthew Silverman as senior vice president and general manager of the Rays in November 2016. He was named recipient of the Sporting News Executive of the Year Award for 2019. He also received the MLB Executive of the Year Award the same year.

On September 8, 2021, Neander signed a multi-year extension with the Rays and was promoted to president of baseball operations.

Personal life
Neander is married and has three children.

References

Living people
People from Oneonta, New York
Tampa Bay Rays executives
Major League Baseball general managers
Sportspeople from New York (state)
Virginia Tech alumni
1983 births